Jake Marketo (born 17 February 1989) is an Australian professional rugby league footballer who plays for the Townsville Blackhawks in the Intrust Super Cup. He previously played for the St. George Illawarra Dragons in the National Rugby League. Marketo also had a short stint playing rugby union for the Timișoara Saracens in the SuperLiga CEC Bank in Romania.

Early life
Born in Wollongong, New South Wales, Australia, Marketo is the son of former Balmain Tigers player Michael Marketo. He played his junior rugby league for Holy Cross Rhinos.

Playing career

Rugby league
Marketo made his NRL debut for the Dragons  in round 11 of the 2010 NRL season, coming off the bench in a 22–14 loss at home to the Canberra Raiders.

Marketo just played one NRL game for the Dragons in 2017 and was axed from the Dragons squad at the end of the year.

Rugby Union
Marketo signed with Romanian rugby union club Timișoara Saracens in November 2017. He played as a centre.

Return To Rugby League
After a few weeks training for the Timișoara Saracens, Marketo decided to return to Australia. He signed with the Townsville Blackhawks for the 2018 season.

References

External links

St. George Illawarra Dragons profile
Townsville Blackhawks profile

1989 births
Living people
Australian rugby league players
New South Wales City Origin rugby league team players
St. George Illawarra Dragons players
Illawarra Cutters players
Redcliffe Dolphins players
Townsville Blackhawks players
Rugby league second-rows
Rugby league locks
Rugby league players from Wollongong